Halobrecta algophila is a species of rove beetle in the family Staphylinidae. It is found in Australia, Europe and Northern Asia (excluding China), North America, South America, and New Zealand.

References

Further reading

 
 

Aleocharinae
Articles created by Qbugbot
Beetles described in 1909